Skjelviki is a small village in the municipality of Askøy in Vestland county, Norway. It is located along the Herdlefjorden on the northern shore of the island of Askøy.  It lies just north of the larger village of Hanevik.

History
Skjelviki was historically part of the old municipality of Alversund. On 15 October 1923, the western part of Alversund (including Skjelviki) was separated into the new municipality of Meland. On 1 January 1964, the district of Hanevik, then with 193 inhabitants and including the Skjelviki area, was transferred to Askøy municipality.

References

Villages in Vestland
Askøy